The ironhead was a Harley-Davidson motorcycle engine, so named because of the composition of the cylinder heads (Iron instead of Aluminium).  The engine is a two-cylinder, two valves per cylinder, pushrod V-twin. It was produced from 1957 until 1985 and was replaced by the Evolution engine in 1986.

This name was applied to the Harley-Davidson Sportster motorcycles that used this engine.

See also
Harley-Davidson engine timeline

External links
 Images of each style of Harley-Davidson engine

Ironhead